Khaled Al Zakiba is Qatari footballer who is a defender. He is a member of the Qatar national football team.

Club career statistics
Statistics accurate as of 21 August 2011

1Includes Emir of Qatar Cup.

2Includes Sheikh Jassem Cup.

3Includes AFC Champions League.

References

External links
 Player profile - QSL.com.qa
 
 Player profile - fifa.com

Living people
Al-Shamal SC players
Qatar SC players
Al-Rayyan SC players
1986 births
Umm Salal SC players
Muaither SC players
Al Bidda SC players
Qatari footballers
Qatar international footballers
Qatar Stars League players
Qatari Second Division players
Association football defenders